William E. Gardner Jr. (March 13, 1939 – April 15, 1991) served as president of Savannah State College from 1989 until 1991.

Biography

He was the ninth president of Savannah State College. His tenure as president saw unprecedented enrollment growth (13 percent) for the college and he successfully led the College to SACS accreditation.  Additionally, he developed a plan to reestablish a teacher certification program at the college. He also established the $2.7 million Advanced Water Technology Institute and oversaw improvements to the physical plant and a $3 million addition to the student center.

During his tenure as president the college held the Centennial Celebration of Savannah State and the Adams Hall was restored and opened as the college’s archives facility. The Hill Hall Restoration Project was also established to provide $1.5 million external funding for the restoration of the historic campus building.

Dr. Gardner was also responsible for the replica of the U.S. Navy "Blue Angels" demonstration flying team jet flown by Donnie Cochran, being placed in front of the McGlockton NROTC Building.

Death
Dr. William E. Gardner Jr. died in office in 1991.  He was succeeded by Annette K. Brock.

Legacy
The William E. Gardner Jr. Hall was named in honor and recognition of his published vision for Savannah State College and his immense popularity with the students.

Suggested Reading
Hall, Clyde W (1991). One Hundred Years of Educating at Savannah State College, 1890-1990. East Peoria, Ill.: Versa Press.

References

Presidents of Savannah State University
1991 deaths
1939 births
20th-century African-American educators
20th-century American academics